Suillus acidus is an edible species of mushroom in the genus Suillus. The species was first described by Charles Horton Peck as Boletus acidus in 1905.

References

External links

acidus
Fungi of North America
Edible fungi
Fungi described in 1905